The 1982 United States Senate election in Arizona took place on November 2, 1982. Incumbent Democratic U.S. Senator Dennis DeConcini won re-election to a second term.

Democratic primary

Candidate 
 Dennis DeConcini, incumbent U.S. Senator
 Caroline P. Killeen, former Roman Catholic nun

Results

Republican primary

Candidates 
 Pete Dunn, State Representative
 Dean Sellers

Results

General election

Candidates 
 Dennis DeConcini (D), Incumbent U.S. Senator
 Pete Dunn (R), State Representative

Results

See also 
 1982 United States Senate elections

References 

1982
Arizona
1982 Arizona elections